New Life Crisis is an American rock band. They're well known for their mash-ups and DJ like sets, customizing & catering to each and every audience. Band Leader, Paul Mahos has become legendary known to amazingly replicate fresh takes on everything from George Michael, David Bowie, Prince, Elton John, U2, Johnny Cash, Elvis, Depeche Mode, Barry White & The Bee Gees.

History and career 
The band was formed in 1986 by Rob Woebber and Jerry Hollis under the name Virginia Dare. They attracted drummer Paul Garafola to offer a mix of originals and covers. They covered songs by bands such as The Cure, Sisters of Mercy, Depeche Mode and The Smiths. After the addition of bassist Dave Isham, they changed their name to New Life Crisis and played the tri-state circuit for years. After Woebber left the band in 1992, the cycled through members until Hollis left and handed the band to his brother Paul Mahos.

Mahos, Stephen Dupree, Matt Kutner, Seth Tieger and Michael Maisano joined in September 1999, signing to Tommy Boy Records in the spring of 2000. Their debut single "Daylight" appeared on MTV's platinum selling Party to Go Remixed and was covered by European group No Angels, selling more than three million copies worldwide in 2001 and 2002.

1990s
In the late 1990s, Paul Mahos performed songs in the Safety4Kids series of VHS tapes and voiced SeeMore the Safety Seal.

2000s
In 2005, the group (Paul Mahos, Stephen Dupree, Jeff Allegue, Steve Bonacio) released their self-titled debut album. The album included the song "Breaking", featured on the MTV series Laguna Beach: The Real O.C... Their single, "Dirty Little Girl" was heard by music executive Stephen Stone from Ruffhouse Entertainment.

In 2006, Stephen Dupree left the band and was replaced by session drummer Steve O'Brien.

In 2007, New Life Crisis performed at the Juvenile Diabetes Research Foundation's Gala.

On October 3, 2007, Paul Mahos and Joe Cumia made guest performances on the XM Radio program The Opie & Anthony Show.

In 2010, New Life Crisis was voted "Best Band in the Hamptons" by Hamptons.com. Mahos was interviewed by Nicole B. Brewer on the online interview show, Main Street Series.

In 2012, Dan's Papers readers named New Life Crisis a Best of the Best winner for local band in the Hamptons. In 2017, PortJeffPulse.com's Kevin Wood interviewed Paul Mahos along with cinematographer Frank Lombardi on the release of the original video single, "We Can Find A Way" 

In 2016, Dan's Papers readers named New Life Crisis Plays 2016 Dan’s Best of the Best Concert November 11.

Members
Paul Mahos – Vocals and guitar
Mick James – Bass guitar
DJ Danx – Turntables and vocals

Former members
Rob Woebber – Keyboards and guitar
Jeff Allegue – Guitar and Bass
Steve O'Brien – Drums
Jerry Hollis – Vocals
Paul Garafola – Drums
Dave Isham – Bass guitar
Tony Saditto – Guitar
Ashby Stokes – Guitar
Stephen Dupree – Drums
Matt Kutner – Keyboards
Michael Maisano – Bass guitar
Seth Tieger – Guitar
Steve Bonacio – Bass guitar

References

American rock music groups